The 2019–20 Coastal Carolina Chanticleers men's basketball team represented Coastal Carolina University in the 2019–20 NCAA Division I men's basketball season. The Chanticleers, led by 13th-year head coach Cliff Ellis, played their home games at the HTC Center in Conway, South Carolina as members of the Sun Belt Conference. They finished the season 16–17, 8–12 in Sun Belt play to finish in a three-way tie for eighth place. They defeated UT Arlington in the first round of the Sun Belt tournament before losing in the second round to Appalachian State.

Previous season
The Chanticleers finished the 2018–19 season 17–17, 9–9 in Sun Belt play to finish in a tie for 6th place. They were defeated by Louisiana–Monroe in the second round of the Sun Belt tournament. They were invited to the CBI, where they defeated Howard in the first round, West Virginia in the quarterfinals, before falling to DePaul in the semifinals.

Roster

Schedule and results

|-
!colspan=12 style=| Non-conference regular season

|-
!colspan=9 style=| Sun Belt Conference regular season

|-
!colspan=12 style=| Sun Belt tournament
|-

|-

Source

References

Coastal Carolina Chanticleers men's basketball seasons
Coastal Carolina Chanticleers
Coastal Carolina Chanticleers men's basketball
Coastal Carolina Chanticleers men's basketball